The 2022 Prague municipal election was held in September 2022 as part of the nationwide municipal elections. It was a victory for Spolu which received the highest number of votes and seats ahead of ANO 2011 in second place. The Czech Pirate Party led by incumbent Mayor Zdeněk Hřib finished third. New coalition was formed 5 months after election and it consists of Spolu, Pirates and STAN. Bohuslav Svoboda became the new mayor.

Background
The Civic Democratic Party received the highest number of votes in the 2018 Prague municipal election but remained in opposition as a coalition was formed by the Czech Pirate Party, Prague Together, TOP 09 and Mayors and Independents. Zdeněk Hřib became the new mayor.

Preparations for the next municipal election started following the 2021 Czech legislative election which resulted in a victory for the Spolu alliance, consisting of the Civic Democratic Party, KDU-ČSL and TOP 09. Leaders of those three parties then discussed continuing their cooperation in the upcoming municipal election. TOP 09 was also approached by Mayors and Independents, who had run on a joint list with TOP 09 in the 2018 municipal election. On 25 January 2022 the Civic Democratic Party, KDU-ČSL and TOP 09 agreed to continue cooperation under the SPOLU platform for the 2022 municipal election. The Pirate Party decided to nominate incumbent mayor Zdeněk Hřib for reelection. On 21 March 2022 Bohuslav Svoboda was reported to be the electoral leader of SPOLU as the Prague organisation of ODS confirmed his nomination. Other parties in SPOLU had previously expressed their support for Svoboda. Svoboda's nomination as a mayoral candidate was confirmed on 4 April 2022.

Seznam Zprávy reported on 28 April 2022 that  might become the ANO 2011 nominee for Mayor. Leader of Prague organisation  Ondřej Prokop and MP Patrik Nacher both confirmed the party's interest in her nomination, although both Prokop and Nacher were also mentioned as potential candidates. On 7 July 2022 Nacher was confirmed to be ANO's mayoral nominee. 

SPOLU launched its campaign on 1 May 2022.

Parties and coalitions
The following parties announced their candidacy and have been registered in opinion polls:

Pre-election composition of assembly

Opinion polls

Result

References

2022
Prague municipal election
Municipal election, 2022